Illinois Route 15 (IL 15) is a  east–west highway in southern Illinois with its western terminus at Illinois Route 3, U.S. Route 40, I-55, and I-64, and its eastern terminus at Wabash River at the Illinois/Indiana Border where it meets State Road 64.

History

West of Mt. Vernon, IL 15 was part of US 460.  Until the 1960s, IL 15 went on the IL 160 corridor from Addieville to Okawville, then west on the present IL 177 corridor to Belleville.  The section from Nashville to St. Libory was once IL 110, but this was back in the 1940s before US 460 was signed.

The current route was determined in 1967.  US 460 was truncated in 1974.

In 2011, the old Parker truss bridge crossing the Wabash River was replaced by a beam bridge.

Major intersections

References

External links

 Illinois Highway Ends: Illinois Route 15

015
Illinois 015
Transportation in Wabash County, Illinois
Transportation in St. Clair County, Illinois
Transportation in Washington County, Illinois
Transportation in Jefferson County, Illinois
Transportation in Wayne County, Illinois
Transportation in Edwards County, Illinois